Kamenice is a river in the Liberec Region of the Czech Republic. It is the longest tributary of the Jizera river in the Czech Republic. It rises from several source streams in the Jizera Mountains at Holubník.

Below the former crystal production village of Kristiánov, a locality in Bedřichov, only Liščí bouda remains preserved as a glass museum near where the Kamenice meets the Josefův Důl dam. The Josefův Důl dam, above the village Josefův Důl, was built between 1976 and 1982 and is the largest dam in the Jizera Mountains. It is used for drinking water, so recreational activities are not permitted upon it.

The Kamenice flows on its course south of the town Tanvald, where it meets the Desná river. It flows on through Velké Hamry. After  it flows through the village of Spálov (part of Semily) in the Jizera Mountains.

On 29 July 1897, a severe flood of the region occurred following the swelling of the Kamenice because of 310 mm/m2 (1.13 in/ft2) of rainfall in the Jizera Mountains that day. The breakup of the bílý Desná dam on 18 September 1916, was also caused by the flooding of the Kamenice.

References

Rivers of the Liberec Region